Stillwater Canyon is a long winding canyon along the Green River in Canyonlands National Park on the border line between Wayne and San Juan counties in southeastern Utah, United States.

Description
The canyon begins at Bonita Bend in the central part of the National Park. From its head, the canyon follows the meanders of the Green River, immediately west of the White Rim (cliff), in a southerly direction until the canyon reaches the mouth of both itself and the Green River at the river's confluence with the Colorado River in the southeastern area of the National Park.

See also

 List of canyons and gorges in Utah

References

External links

Canyons and gorges of Utah
Landforms of Wayne County, Utah
Landforms of San Juan County, Utah
Green River (Colorado River tributary)